The Pilgrim Baptist Church located at 732 Central Avenue West in Saint Paul in the U.S. state of Minnesota is the building that houses the first Black Baptist congregation in Saint Paul.  The congregation was founded on November 15, 1866, by Reverend Robert Hickman and a group of escaped slaves from Boone County, Missouri.  They were smuggled up the Mississippi River on the steamer War Eagle with the help of Union Soldiers and the Underground Railroad. The current building, which is listed on the National Register of Historic Places, was built in 1928.

References

External links

African-American history in Minneapolis–Saint Paul
Baptist churches in Minnesota
Churches completed in 1928
Churches in Saint Paul, Minnesota
Churches on the Underground Railroad
National Register of Historic Places in Saint Paul, Minnesota
Churches on the National Register of Historic Places in Minnesota
Romanesque Revival church buildings in Minnesota